Henri Rancoule (6 February 1933 – 15 March 2021) was a French rugby union player. He played the wing position for FC Lourdes, RC Toulonnais, Tarbes Pyrénées Rugby, and US Carcassonne, as well as the French national team.

Awards

Club
Winner of the French Rugby Union Championship (1956, 1957, 1958)
Runner-up of the French Rugby Union Championship (1955)
Winner of the Challenge Yves du Manoir (1953, 1954, 1956)

National Team
Winner of the Five Nations Championship (1955, 1959, 1960, 1961, 1962)
Bronze Medal at the Five Nations Championship (1958)

References

1933 births
2021 deaths
French rugby union players
US Carcassonne players
Rugby union wings
France international rugby union players